Zhiar Ali (Sorani alphabet: , , born ) is a former animal rights activist and a Kurdish advocate for LGBT rights. He presently resides in the Netherlands after having been based in Sulaymaniyah, Iraq. In Iraqi Kurdistan, Ali is well known for his contributions to LGBT rights, including founding Yeksani, a group that works to promote LGBT rights in the Kurdistan Region. He is currently Yeksani's executive director and was a founding member of Kurdistan Vegans, Iraq's first pro-vegan animal rights group. Additionally, he has worked as a freelance journalist for news outlets, specialising in music journalism as well as political and social concerns.

In 2020, Ali was the target of a number of media campaigns that propagandised against the LGBT community. He also received threats of violence and murder. Following Ali's address on June 27, 2020, at Global Pride, which was hosted by InterPride, these assaults became more severe. Ali has been outspoken in his criticism of the Kurdistan Regional Government (KRG) for failing to appropriately address abuses of the LGBT population in the Kurdistan region.

Misperceptions that all gay individuals were sex workers, perpetuated by conservative polities and their proxy medias, served as the catalyst for the campaign against Ali and the LGBT community. In an interview with Middle East Eye, Ali sought to clarify this misconception and pointed out that some members of the LGBT community in the Kurdistan region may be driven into sex work due to lack of economic opportunities and blamed the KRG for not addressing this issue. He emphasised that prostitution is often a last resort for many individuals to earn a living.

Personal life 
Ali is the youngest of five siblings. In a 2017 interview with makanati.net, he revealed that he came out as gay to his mother and older sister that same year, and that this was around the same time he founded Lava Foundation, an unregistered organisation working to raise awareness about LGBT issues. Lava's media activities were absorbed into Rasan before the organisation went dormant due to a lawsuit that demanded the organisation be shut down for promoting LGBT human rights. Ali then found Yeksani to independently continue his activism.

In addition to his activism for LGBT rights, Ali also advocated for a plant-based lifestyle. In 2018, he co-founded Kurdistan Vegans, Iraq's first vegan organisations. The organisation focused on promoting environmentalism, raising awareness about healthy living, and promoting a vegan lifestyle. As a vegan for five years, Ali has spoken about the challenges of maintaining a vegan diet in Iraq, where vegan products are often scarce, difficult to find, and overpriced. He has also claimed that the organisation's activism has led to the opening of a vegan restaurant.

Career 

Zhiar Ali started his advocacy career in 2017 when he established the Lava Foundation, a group devoted to promoting LGBT causes. He was hired by Rasan, a group tackling related challenges, in late 2019, and Lava Foundation's initiatives were absorbed into Rasan. After working with Rasan for more than a year, Ali made the decision to leave the organisation and launch Yeksani, a movement dedicated to promoting LGBT rights in the Kurdistan Region.

In addition to his work as an LGBT rights activist, Ali was also an advocate for animal rights. He previously served as the project manager of Kurdistan Vegans, where he organised and coordinated World Vegan Day events for two consecutive years. He also wrote on music journalism and other topics such as conflict in the Middle East, LGBT rights in Iraq, and social and civic issues for a local independent news outlet.

LGBT Activism 
Through his activism, Ali hopes to increase public knowledge of the struggles the local LGBT population faces, bring these issues to the attention of national and international actors to spur action, and seek to integrate the group into Kurdish society. He has stressed that due to a lack of public awareness and understanding, the living conditions for LGBT+ people in Kurdistan are subpar.

I do not care what Kurdish leaders are tweeting or saying to consulates and embassies in meetings, we do not need their 'deep concern' and tokenistic efforts; we need real action. We need legislation. We want representation in politics, – Ali to Middle East Eye in an interview.

As an LGBT rights activist, Zhiar Ali uses social media as a key tool for raising awareness and promoting change. He is known for shedding light on the legal loopholes that are often used to detain and mistreat LGBT individuals in his region, particularly Articles 393, 394, 400, and 401. In an interview with BBC Persian, he highlighted the ways in which these laws are misused to unlawfully detain and persecute members of the LGBT community.

Pride flag backlash 
On May 17, 2020, the European Union (EU), the British, and Canadian embassies raised the pride flag at their Baghdad headquarters, which led to significant backlash and criticism. The EU embassy was forced to take down the flag after a few hours. This incident sparked a hate campaign against the LGBT community in Iraq, which was supported by some prominent Iraqi politicians.

In response, Ali authored an extensive report on the situation of LGBT individuals in Iraq, which was published on the website of Rasan, an organisation he was involved in. The report documented instances of violence and murder targeting people perceived to be gay, as well as instances of hate speech against the LGBT community broadcast on national television. The report was later used as a resource for assessments and further studies on LGBT rights in the region.

Rasan lawsuit 

On February 22, 2021, it was announced that a lawsuit had been filed against Rasan by a member of the Islamist Kurdistan Justice Group, who argued that the organization's advocacy for local LGBT+ rights was "against the values of the Kurdish culture." In response, Rasan stated that they would defend themselves against the lawsuit in court and that they work for the rights of all individuals equally. Ali spoke out against the MP during a live Rudaw interview, defending the rights of the LGBT+ community and stating that the MP's accusations were "baseless and not based on any scientific evidence." He emphasized that the promotion of LGBT+ rights is a fundamental aspect of human rights and should be respected and protected by the government and society.

Asayish operation 
On April 1, 2021, news broke that the Kurdish security forces, known as Asayish, had set up checkpoints in Sulaymaniyah and arrested a number of individuals suspected of being gay. Despite widespread public condemnation of the operation on social media, it received support from a group of seventeen members of Sulaymaniyah's Provincial Council who signed a petition in its favor.

In response to the arrests, Ali, the executive director of Yeksani, launched an online campaign called "Take Action" which aimed to bring attention to the issue and help bring it to the attention of international actors. Some relevant ones that commented included Amnesty International, the US Consulate in Erbil, Human Rights Watch, and ILGA Asia. The campaign received widespread support and helped bring the issue to the attention of international and local groups.

It was later revealed that the decision to conduct the operation was influenced by conservative groups in the region, particularly the Kurdistan Justice Group (formerly Kurdistan Islamic Group) and Kurdistan Islamic Union. These groups have been known to actively promote discriminatory views towards the LGBT community. Members of the KJG have been seen on TV promoting the use of anti-LGBT vocabulary.

According to Ali, the operation led to the arrest of 15 individuals, some of whom were underage. He reported that security checkpoints were set up in places known to be popular among the LGBT community. Ali also claimed that Asaiysh did not differentiate between LGBT sex workers and other members of the community, and that the operation was later rebranded as a crackdown on prostitution to avoid international backlash.

He strongly criticised the use of "tests" by security forces to determine if suspects had engaged in sexual activity before their arrest, calling the tests criminal and humiliating. He also told Middle East Eye that even if some individuals have resorted to sex work, it is the government's fault for not providing them with other means of livelihood. He emphasised that the government should be held responsible for the poor living conditions of LGBT individuals in Kurdistan, and the lack of alternatives leads many to engage in sex work.

Throughout the operation, Ali repeatedly warned the media that the lives of the community were in danger and that he, as an openly gay individual, was afraid of being caught at one of the checkpoints. He called on the public and international organisations to speak out against the operation and put pressure on the Kurdish government to release the detainees and stop the operation.

Due to the pressure from civil-rights organisations and activists, Asayish eventually stopped the operation, released the detainees, and issued a statement that they were investigating reports of prostitution in the region and did not "target any specific groups of society." However, Ali and other activists pointed out that the operation was clearly targeting the LGBT community, and that the statement was a cover-up for the human rights violations that occurred during the operation.

As a result of the discrimination and the operation, Ali reported that many LGBT people, including himself, felt excluded from Kurdish society. Many others also condemned the operation as dehumanising and criminal. Ali also criticised other NGOs that claim to work on LGBT rights, stating that despite receiving significant funding, they take little action in reality and are often only symbolic entities. He emphasised the need for organisations that are truly committed to advocating for the rights and well-being of the LGBT community in Kurdistan.

Justice for Doski Azad 

Ali has spoken out against the Kurdish government's failure to publicly denounce the murder of Doski Azad, one of the only few publicly transgender women, whose body was discovered on January 31, 2022. Ali emphasised his dissatisfaction with the government's response in an interview with Al Monitor, saying that the LGBT community is highly concerned about the ongoing breaches of their human rights in the region.

He also drew parallels between Azad's murder and that of Misho, a transgender internet personality who was killed by her brother the previous year, and called on the Kurdish regional government to take stronger action to prevent such killings. He highlighted that honour killings are prevalent in the Kurdistan Region and that Azad's case is just one of many that he could highlight, pointing out that living openly as an LGBT person in Iraq is very dangerous due to the risks of being targeted. Ali's statement and the case of Doski Azad were widely reported by international media and LGBT rights organizations.

Housing and occupational discrimination 
During an interview, Ali discussed the difficulties with being part of the LGBT+ community and finding housing, reporting that many LGBT+ youth are denied rent or properties are not sold to them, so they are forced to marry the opposite gender to obtain a residence. He also talked about how the Directorate of Non-Governmental Organizations have made it impossible to register LGBT organizations in the region.

Yeksani reports that, in addition to housing discrimination, there is also occupational discrimination, with LGBT individuals not promoted or even fired from their jobs due to their sexual orientation. To solve the situation, the group demands anti-discrimination laws be put in place, which is also "sending a clear message that discrimination and violence against the LGBT community are not tolerated."

Music career 
On May 9, 2022, Ali made his musical debut by independently releasing a single titled "Miles Away" on music streaming platforms including Spotify and Apple Music.

See also 
 Rasan
 IraQueer
 Human rights in Kurdistan Region
 LGBT in Islam
 LGBT rights in Iraq

References

External links 

Kurdish musicians
Kurdish singer-songwriters
Kurdish activists
Iraqi LGBT rights activists
Animal rights activists
Kurdish journalists
Living people
1999 births
Veganism activists
Kurdish LGBT people
Iraqi human rights activists